Matheus Martinelli Lima (born 5 October 2001), known as Matheus Martinelli or just Martinelli, is a Brazilian footballer who currently plays as a midfielder for Fluminense.

Club career
Born in Presidente Prudente, São Paulo, Martinelli started playing football at Marília, later playing for other clubs from the State of São Paulo before joining Fluminense in 2017.

Martinelli made his professional debut for Fluminense on 1 December 2020, starting in a 0–0 Série A draw against Red Bull Bragantino. He subsequently became a regular with the Tricolor, scoring 3 goals in 11 games and being named Série A man of the weekend on the 16 February 2021 after his performance against Ceará, scoring the second goal in his team 3–1 away win.

Career statistics

References

External links
 

2001 births
Living people
People from Presidente Prudente, São Paulo
Brazilian people of Italian descent
Brazilian footballers
Association football midfielders
Campeonato Brasileiro Série A players
Fluminense FC players
Footballers from São Paulo (state)